Eugeniusz Janczak (born 13 September 1955) is a Polish sports shooter. He competed in the mixed 50 metre running target event at the 1980 Summer Olympics.

References

1955 births
Living people
Polish male sport shooters
Olympic shooters of Poland
Shooters at the 1980 Summer Olympics
Sportspeople from Wrocław